Manuel del Cabral (7 March 1907, in Santiago de los Caballeros, Dominican Republic – 14 May 1999, in Santo Domingo) was a Dominican poet, writer, and diplomat. The son of Mario Fermín Cabral y Báez, an influential senator during the "Era of Trujillo", he served at the Embassy of the Dominican Republic to Argentina. During his long stay in Buenos Aires, he married an Argentine and fathered his 4 children, among them, the television journalist and politician Peggy Cabral. In 1992 he was awarded the Premio Nacional de Literatura.

Work and reception
Cabral has become one of the most celebrated writers of the Dominican Republic, enjoying international fame. His work is most often viewed as an essential representation of Afro-Antillean or Afro-Caribbean  poetry, known alternatively as negrismo (blackism or negrism) or poesía negra (black poetry) in Spanish, along with the works of Cuban Nicolás Guillén and Puerto Rican Luis Palés Matos.

Cabral is known for his vast exploration of themes.  Perennial human concerns such as love, death, metaphysics, and war occur throughout his writings. Additionally, social and political issues, especially those involving Antillean and Dominican identity, as well as the exploitation of Afro-Caribbeans are prominent in his writings.

Cabral first gained recognition with Compadre Mon (1943), often considered the best example of a Dominican Epic.  Compadre Mon, like Trópico Negro and other major works, center around themes of labor and social injustice.

Diplomacy 

Manuel del Cabral was ambassador to the United States, Peru, Colombia, Brazil, Chile, Spain and Argentina. In the late 1950s he defected and sought political asylum in Argentina, where he lived for 17 years with his family.

Works

 Trópico Negro. 1942
 Compadre Mon. Espiral, Colombia 1943
 Chinchina Busca el Tiempo. Perlado, Buenos Aires 1945 (Ed. de Colores, Santo Domingo 1998)
 De Este Lado del Mar. Impresora Dominicana, Ciudad Trujillo 1949
 Antología Tierra (1930–1949). Ediciones Cultura Hispánica, Madrid 1949
 Carta a Rubén. Madrid 1950
 Los Huéspedes Secretos. Madrid 1950 (Ed. Corripio, Santo Domingo 1988),
 Segunda Antología Tierra (1930–1951). Gráficas García, Madrid 1951
 30 Parábolas. Lucania, Buenos Aires 1956
 Antología Clave (1930–1956). Losada, Buenos Aires 1957
 14 Nudos de Amor. Losada, Buenos Aires 1963
 El Escupido. Quintaria, Buenos Aires 1970 (Ed. de Colores, Santo Domingo 1987)
 El Presidente Negro. Ediciones Carlos Lohlé, Buenos Aires 1973 (Canahuate, Santo Domingo 1990)
 Poemas de Amor y Sexo. Ediciones de la Flor, Buenos Aires 1974
 Cuentos. Ediciones Orión, Buenos Aires 1976
 Antología Tres. Editora Universitaria, Santo Domingo 1983
 Obra Poética Completa, Ed. Alfa & Omega, Santo Domingo 1987
 Antología Poética, E. Biblioteca Nacional, Buenos Aires 1998. 
 Antología de Cuentos, E. Biblioteca Nacional, Buenos Aires 1998.

References

Bibliography

 Wena Monica Palmer: Social consciousness and compromiso in selected writings of Manuel del Cabral. University of the West Indies, Mona, Jamaica, 1982
  Manuel Antonio Arango L.: Historia, intrahistoria y compromiso social en siete poetas hispánicos. Rubén Darío, Federico García Lorca, Nicolás Guillén, Manuel del Cabral, Palés Matos, César Vallejo y Pablo Neruda, Lang 2007, 
Gutiérrez, Franklin.  Antología histórica de la poesía dominicana del siglo XX (1912–1995). New York: Ediciones Alcance, 1995.
Diaz, Andrés Blanco. Manuel del Cabral y su obra: comentarios y critica. Santo Domingo, Dominican Republic: Comisión Permanente de la Feria del Libro, 2001.
Bejel, Emilio. "Poetry." A History of Literature in the Caribbean. Vol. 1. Arnold, A. James. Ed. Philadelphia: John Benjamins Publishing Company, 1994.
Torres-Saillant, Silvio. "Dominican Literature and Its Criticism: Anatomy of a Troubled Identity." A History of Literature in the Caribbean. Vol. 1. Arnold, A. James. Ed. Philadelphia: John Benjamins Publishing Company, 1994.
Torres-Saillant, Silvio. Caribbean Poetics: Towards an Aesthetic of West Indian Literature. New York: Cambridge University Press, 1997.
Rodríguez, Linda M. "Dominican Republic." Encyclopedia of Latin American Literature. Ed. Verity Smith. Chicago: Fitzroy Dearborn, 1997.
Burdiez, Tómas Castro. Ed. La magia de lo permanente: antología poética de Manuel del Cabral. Santo Domingo, Dominican Republic: Editorial Ciguapa, 2001.

External links
Manuel del Cabral on Bibliotecas Virtuales (Biography in Spanish)
Biography and Selected Poems (Spanish)
H-NET Caribbean (List Serve and Discussion Network)
English translation of one of Manuel del Cabral's poems at Poems Found in Translation

20th-century Dominican Republic poets
Descendants of Buenaventura Báez
Dominican Republic male poets
Dominican Republic people of Basque descent
Dominican Republic people of Canarian descent
Dominican Republic people of Catalan descent
Dominican Republic people of French descent
Dominican Republic people of Galician descent
Dominican Republic people of Italian descent
Dominican Republic people of Portuguese descent
1907 births
1999 deaths
Dominican Republic diplomats
Ambassadors of the Dominican Republic to the United States
Ambassadors of the Dominican Republic to Chile
Ambassadors of the Dominican Republic to Peru
Ambassadors of the Dominican Republic to Colombia
Ambassadors of the Dominican Republic to Brazil
Ambassadors of the Dominican Republic to Spain
Ambassadors of the Dominican Republic to Argentina
20th-century male writers
White Dominicans